Dostuk (formerly "Serniy") is a village in Suzak District, Jalal-Abad Region, Kyrgyzstan. Its population was 1,960 in 2021. It is situated near the confluence of the rivers Kögart and Kara Darya.

References

Populated places in Jalal-Abad Region